Wetherton may refer to:
Wetherton, the central character in short story "Trap of Gold" by Louis L'Amour
Wetherton, fictional town in Yorkshire, England, setting for UK TV series Dalziel and Pascoe
Wetherton, a fictional railway station in Worcestershire, England, featuring in 1990s UK TV series Oh, Doctor Beeching!